The British Horseball Association is the governing body and organising organisation for the equestrian sport of horseball.  The association is a member of the Federation of International Horseball and in the UK is one of the 16 organisations which form part of the British Equestrian Federation.

Governance
The association was formed in the UK in 1991 as a limited company with a volunteer management.

External links
 British Horseball Association official website

References

Equestrian organizations
1991 establishments in the United Kingdom
Sports organizations established in 1991
Horse ball
Equestrian sports in the United Kingdom